Vigo di Cadore is a comune (municipality) in the province of Belluno in the Italian region of Veneto, located about  north of Venice and about  northeast of Belluno.

Main sights 
Vigo's main attraction is the church of Sant'Orsola, built in the 14th century by Ainardo da Vigo, the son of the da Camino's family last podestà of Cadore. In the frazione of Laggio is the church of Santa Margherita (c. 1305), with Byzantine-style frescoes. Speech is an eastern dialect of Ladin.

References 

Cities and towns in Veneto